Hamad bin Isa bin Salman Al Khalifa (28 January 1950) is King of Bahrain since 14 February 2002, after ruling as Emir of Bahrain from 6 March 1999. 

He is the son of Isa bin Salman Al Khalifa, the previous and first emir. The country has been ruled by the Al Khalifa dynasty since 1783.

Early life and education 

Hamad bin Isa Al Khalifa was born on 28 January 1950 in Riffa, Bahrain. His parents were Isa bin Salman Al Khalifa, then Crown Prince, and Hessa bint Salman Al Khalifa.

After attending Manama secondary school in Bahrain, Hamad was sent to England to attend Applegarth College in Godalming, Surrey before taking a place at The Leys School in Cambridge.  Hamad then underwent military training, first with the British Army at Mons Officer Cadet School at Aldershot in Hampshire, graduating in September 1968. Four years later, in June 1972, Hamad attended the United States Army Command and General Staff College at Fort Leavenworth in Kansas, graduating the following June with a degree in leadership.

Crown prince 

Hamad was designated as heir apparent by his father on 27 June 1964. In 1968, he was appointed as the chairman of the irrigation council and Manama municipal council. He was commissioned into the Bahrain National Guard on 16 February 1968 and appointed as its commander the same year, remaining in that post until 1969 when he was appointed as the commander-in-chief of the Bahrain Defence Force. In 1970, Hamad became the head of the Bahraini department of defence and the vice-chairman of the administrative council, remaining in both offices until 1971. From 1971 to 1988 he was the minister of state for defence.

In October 1977, Sheikh Hamad started learning to fly helicopters, successfully completing the training in January 1978. He then worked to establish the Bahrain Amiri Air Force, which came into being in 1987 when the defence force air wing was reconstituted as an air force.

Reign 

On the death of his father Isa bin Salman Al Khalifa, Hamad became Emir of Bahrain on 6 March 1999. As Emir, Hamad brought several political reforms to Bahrain. These included the release of all political prisoners, the dissolution of the State Security Court and the abolition of the 1974 Decree on State Security Measures. Additionally, many Bahraini citizens were permitted to return after several years in exile overseas. In 2002, he declared himself king. He enjoys wide executive authorities which include appointing the prime minister and his ministers, commanding the army, chairing the Higher Judicial Council, appointing the parliament's upper half and dissolving its elected lower half.

Political turmoil 

After Hamad took power in 1999, he focused on attaining stability in a nation riddled with profound tensions after the 1990s uprising. The King succeeded in improving the living standards and in making Bahrain a financial hub. During the period 2003–2010 the Shi'ite community accused his government of corruption, discrimination in housing and jobs, recruiting foreigners to the military services and bringing Sunni tribes from Asia to change the demographic composition of the nation.

Although King Hamad's reign has seen the admittance of Shi'ites into positions in the government, there have still been calls for a more equitable distribution of positions and jobs. The Al Khalifa family lead a large number of ministerial and governmental posts including the Ministry of the Interior, Ministry of Justice, the Ministry of Finance, the Ministry of Culture, the Ministry of Foreign Affairs, the Bahrain Economic Development Board and the Supreme Council for Women. The vast majority of significant positions in the Bahrain Defence Force are held by Sunnis.

2011 Bahraini uprising 

On 14 February 2011, the tenth anniversary of a referendum in favour of the National Action Charter, and ninth anniversary of the writing of the Constitution of 2002, Bahrain was rocked by protests inspired by the Arab Spring and co-ordinated by a Facebook page named "Day of Rage in Bahrain", a page that was liked by tens of thousands just one week after its creation. The Bahrain government responded with what has been described as a "brutal" crackdown on the protests, including violations of human rights that caused anger. Later on, demonstrators demanded that Hamad step down. As a result of this "massive" crackdown, Foreign Policy Magazine classified him as ranking 3rd out of 8 of "America's Unsavory Allies" calling him "one of the bad guys the U.S. still supports".

On 11 February 2011, King Hamad ordered that 1,000 Bahraini Dinars (approximately US$2,667) be given to "each family" to celebrate the tenth anniversary of the National Action Charter referendum. Agence France-Presse linked the BD1,000 payments to 14 February 2011 demonstration plans.

On 15 February 2011, Hamad apologized for the deaths of two demonstrators in a rare TV speech and urged an investigation into the incident. Two days later, four protesters were killed and hundreds wounded when protesters were attacked in Pearl Roundabout at 03:00 am local time. The Pearl Roundabout was evacuated and encircled by the Bahraini army. Two days later, Prince Salman, Hamad's son, ordered the withdrawal of army troops from there after the death of another protester caused by live ammunition next to Pearl roundabout.

During the peak of the Bahraini uprising in mid March 2011, Hamad declared a State of National Safety for three months just after Salman summoned Peninsula Shield Force troops to enter Bahrain. Saudi Arabia deployed about 1,000 troops with armoured support, and the United Arab Emirates deployed about 500 troops. Opposition parties reacted strongly, calling it an "occupation". Hamad, however, claimed that he deployed the troops to "protect infrastructure and to secure key installations". 

In June 2011, Hamad commissioned the Bahrain Independent Commission of Inquiry, headed by respected human rights lawyer M. Cherif Bassiouni, to look into the events surrounding the unrest. The establishment of the BICI was praised by Barack Obama and the international community as a step towards establishing responsibility and accountability for the events of the 2011–2012 Bahraini uprising. The BICI reported its findings in November 2011 and U.S. Secretary of State Hillary Clinton "commend[ed] King Hamad bin Isa al-Khalifa's initiative in commissioning it". In August 2012, Amnesty International stated that "the government's response has only scratched the surface of these issues. Reforms have been piecemeal, perhaps aiming to appease Bahrain's international partners, and have failed to provide real accountability and justice for the victims".

Foreign relations 

The king was invited by the British court to the wedding of Prince William, but declined amidst protests by human rights activists, who had pledged to disrupt his stay in Britain because of his violent response to demonstrators.
In August 2020, King Hamad explained to visiting U.S. Secretary of State Mike Pompeo that Bahrain is committed to the creation of a Palestinian state, implicitly rejecting the normalization of ties with Israel. However, on 11 September 2020, it was announced that Bahrain and Israel had agreed to establish full diplomatic relations. On 15 September 2020, Bahrain officially opened state to state relations with Israel, signing diplomatic agreements at a public ceremony at the White House in Washington, D.C.

On 19 September 2022, he attended the state funeral of Queen Elizabeth II at Westminster Abbey, London.

Personal life 
Hamad has four wives and has had in total twelve children: seven sons and five daughters.

 He married his first wife (also his first cousin), Sheikha Sabika bint Ibrahim Al Khalifa, at Rifa'a on 9 October 1968. She is Bahraini and together they have three sons and one daughter:
 Sheikh Salman bin Hamad bin Isa Al Khalifa, Crown Prince of Bahrain (born 21 October 1969)
 Sheikh Abdullah bin Hamad bin Isa Al Khalifa (born 30 June 1975)
 Sheikh Khalifa bin Hamad Al Khalifa (born 4 June 1977)
 Sheikha Najla bint Hamad Al Khalifa (born 20 May 1981)

 His second wife, Sheikha Sheia bint Hassan Al Khrayyesh Al Ajmi is from Kuwait. Together they have two sons:
 Sheikh Nasser bin Hamad Al Khalifa (born 8 May 1987)
 Sheikh Khalid bin Hamad Al Khalifa (born 23 September 1989)

 His third wife, Sheikha Hessa bint Faisal bin Muhammad bin Shuraim Al Marri, with whom he has one son and two daughters
 Sheikh Faisal bin Hamad Al Khalifa (12 February 1991 – 12 January 2006), died in a car accident.
 Sheikha Noura bint Hamad Al Khalifa (born 6 November 1993)
 Sheikha Munira bint Hamad Al Khalifa (born 15 July 1990)

 His fourth wife, Sheikha Manal bint Jabor Al Naimi, with whom he has one son and two daughters:
 Sheikh Sultan bin Hamad Al Khalifa (born 1997)
 Sheikha Hessa bint Hamad Al Khalifa
 Sheikha Rima bint Hamad Al Khalifa (born 2002)

Honours and awards 

King Hamad has received numerous honours from:
 : Grand Cordon of the Order of the Star of Jordan (1 February 1967)
  Iraq: Member 1st class  of the Order of the Two Rivers (22 February 1969)
 : Member Special Class of the Order of Muhammad (16 October 1970)
 : Grand Cordon of the Supreme Order of the Renaissance (1 September 1972)
 : Grand Cordon of the Order of the Republic (24 January 1973)
  Iran: Collar of the Order of the Crown (28 April 1973)
 : Collar of the Order of Abdulaziz al Saud (4 April 1976)
 : Star of the Republic of Indonesia, 1st class (8 October 1977)
 : Member 1st class of the Order of Merit (1 April 1978)
 : Collar of the Order of Makarios III (9 March 2015)
 : Member 1st class of the Order of Oman (24 October 2022)
 : Honorary Knight Commander of the Order of St Michael and St George (KCMG, 15 February 1979)
 : Member 1st class of the Order of the Grand Conqueror of Libya (1 September 1979)
 : Knight Grand Cross of the Order of Isabella the Catholic (4 December 1981)
 : Honorary Recipient of the Order of the Crown of the Realm (DMN, 28 October 2000)
 : Collar of the Order of Zayed (2 February 2005)
 : Honorary Fellow of the Royal College of Surgeons in Ireland (Hon FRCSI, 2006)
 : Member 1st class of the Order of the Republic of the Yemen (25 March 2010)
 : Grand Cross of the Order of the Dannebrog (SK, 4 February 2011)
 : Grand Cross of the National Order of Merit 
 : Grand Cordon of the Order of the Republic (27 January 2016)
 : Collar of the Order of the Nile (26 April 2016)
 : Grand Collar of the State of Palestine (10 April 2017)
 : Recipient of the Royal Family Order of the Crown of Brunei (DKMB, 3 May 2017)
 : Member of the Order of Neutrality (18 March 2019).
 : Grand Commander of the Royal Family Order of Johor (DK I, 26 November 2017)
 : Grand Collar of the Order of the Southern Cross (12 November 2021).
 : Honorary Doctorate from Moscow State Institute of International Relations (2 July 2021)

Ancestry

See also 
 Politics of Bahrain

References

External links 

 The New Amir of Bahrain: Marching Sideways, Abdulhadi Khalaf, Civil Society, Volume 9, Issue 100, April 2000
  (227 KB), Abdulhadi Khalaf, Fourth Mediterranean Social and Political Research Meeting, European University Institute, March 2003
 Generational change and elite-driven reforms in the Kingdom of Bahrain. (Sir William Luce Fellowship Paper No. 7) Dr. Steven Wright (2006) Institute for Middle East and Islamic Studies, University of Durham
 Bahrain: The Royals rule, Le Monde Diplomatique, March 2005
  An Arab exception: Reform in Bahrain The Economist, 29 July 2004 (requires subscription)
 

1950 births
Living people
Hamad
Hamad
Hamad
Graduates of the Mons Officer Cadet School
Hamad
Hamad
Marshals of the air force
People educated at The Leys School
People of the Bahraini uprising of 2011
United States Army Command and General Staff College alumni

Grand Cross of the Ordre national du Mérite
Grand Crosses of the Order of the Dannebrog
Honorary Knights Commander of the Order of St Michael and St George
Knights Grand Cross of the Order of Isabella the Catholic
Recipients of Grand Collar of the State of Palestine